National Pingtung Senior High School is a senior high school in Pingtung City, Pingtung County, Taiwan.

Notable alumni
 Steve Chang, Co-founder and former CEO of Trend Micro
 CC Lee, Cleveland Indians pitcher
 Chen Yun-wen, baseball player

See also
 Education in Taiwan

References

1938 establishments in Taiwan
Educational institutions established in 1938
High schools in Taiwan
Schools in Pingtung County